The Sacrifices to Cupid (AKA L'Offrande à l'Amour or The Offerings to Cupid; ru: "Жертвы Амуру, или Радости любви") is a "grand ballet" in 1 Act/1 scene with choreography by Marius Petipa and music by Ludwig Minkus.

The ballet was first presented by the Imperial Ballet on July 22/August 3, 1886, in honour of Empress Maria Feodorovna (Dagmar of Denmark), at Petergof by the Imperial Ballet, and on November 25/December 7 (Julian/Gregorian calendar dates), 1886 at the Imperial Mariinsky Theatre. Principal Dancers: Eugeniia Sokolova (as Chloë)

Revivals

Revival by Lev Ivanov for the Imperial Ballet, first presented on September 26/October 8, 1893 at the Imperial Mariinsky Theatre. Principal Dancers: Olga Preobrajenskaya (as Chloë)

Notes

This work was Minkus' last composition for the Imperial Ballet as First Imperial Ballet Composer before the post was abolished in 1886 by the Mariinsky Theatre's director Ivan Vsevolozhsky.

Ballets by Marius Petipa
Ballets by Ludwig Minkus
1886 ballet premieres
Ballets premiered at the Peterhof Theatre